Brad Elliot Solomon (born May 29, 1983) is an American professional boxer.

Amateur career
A three time National Golden Gloves Champion, once in the Welterweight and twice in the Junior Welterweight divisions. In 2007 at the United States Amateur championships he Lost the semi-final fight to Mexican American Javier Molina 13 to 17. He had a record of 20 wins and 5 losses.

Pro career
On December 3, 2009 Solomon beat undefeated Prospect Ray Robinson by a S.D. in an 8-round bout. Brad would also win against undefeated Prospect, Puerto Rican Kenny Galarza in a 10-round unanimous decision.

On January 18, 2011 Solomon recorded his biggest win so far, defeating 30-1-1 Demetrius Hopkins by Unanimous decision at the Seminole Hard Rock Hotel and Casino, Hollywood, Florida, USA.

Solomon won and defended on multiple occasions the World Boxing Association International title.

Solomon fought on the undercard of Floyd Mayweather Jr. vs. Manny Pacquiao.  On that card Solomon defeated Adrian Granados by split decision.

Professional boxing record

References

External links

1983 births
Living people
American male boxers
Boxers from Louisiana
Sportspeople from Lafayette, Louisiana
Welterweight boxers
National Golden Gloves champions